Ahmad of Brunei (also known as Awang Pateh Berbai or Pateh Berbai) was the second Sultan of Brunei. He was the brother of the first sultan, Muhammad Shah of Brunei. He ascended the throne in 1408 and changed his name to Ahmad. He was succeeded on his death by his son-in-law Sharif Ali.

Other information
He was the first Pengiran Bendahara (Vizier) in Brunei, and was later given the title Pengiran Bendahara Seri Maharaja Permaisuara. He married the younger sister of Ong Sum Ping (also known as Pengiran Maharaja Lela). Sultan Ahmad died in 1425 while his sons Nakhoda Angging and Nakhoda Sangkalang were Brunei Maharaja in Sulu and Maharaja in Borneo respectively. Thus, he was succeeded by his son-in-law, Sultan Seri Ali or Sharif Ali, the great Sufi Berkat.

References

15th-century Sultans of Brunei